...e vennero in quattro per uccidere Sartana! is an Italian 1969 Spaghetti Western film directed by Demofilo Fidani.

Release
...e vennero in quattro per uccidere Sartana! is not an official release in the Sartana film series. It was released in 1969 along with Fidani's other "Sartana" film Shadow of Sartana... Shadow of your Death. The film was re-issued three years after its release in 1972 with the title Beyond the Frontiers of Hate with a director credited as in promotions and advertising as Alessandro Santini. Thomas Weisser commented on the reissue in his book on Spaghetti Westerns, stating that most of the reissues of the film have no credits at all.

Reception
In a retrospective review, Weisser commented that Jeff Cameron "sleepwalks" through the film and declared that director Demofilo was a "cherished industry hack."

Footnotes

References

External links

1969 films
Spaghetti Western films
1969 Western (genre) films
1960s Italian films